Takako Konishi (born 25 September 1986) is a Japanese synchronized swimmer. She was part of the Japanese team that took the silver medal at the 2006 Asian Games in Doha. Konishi was a reserve participant for the team that took the silver medal at the 2004 Summer Olympics.

References

External links
 FINA Synchronised Swimming World Cup 2006 

Living people
1986 births
Japanese synchronized swimmers
Asian Games medalists in artistic swimming
Artistic swimmers at the 2006 Asian Games
Asian Games silver medalists for Japan
Medalists at the 2006 Asian Games
21st-century Japanese women